Tennell is a surname. Notable people with the surname include:

 Adron Tennell (born 1987), American football player
 Bradie Tennell (born 1998), American figure skater
 Derek Tennell (born 1964), American football player

See also
 Mennell